The Minister for National Defence of Greece is a government minister responsible for the running of the Ministry of National Defence. The current minister is Nikos Panagiotopoulos in the Cabinet of Kyriakos Mitsotakis.

Ministers for National Defence since 1996

External links
Hellenic Ministry of National Defence - Official Website

Lists of government ministers of Greece
 
Greece